Gamy is a rural locality (a village) in Ust-Kachkinskoye Rural Settlement, Permsky District, Perm Krai, Russia. The population was 344 as of 2010. There are 17  streets.

Geography 
Gamy is located 53 km west of Perm (the district's administrative centre) by road. Kachka is the nearest rural locality.

References 

Rural localities in Permsky District